Nelly Commergnat (28 November 1943 – 15 December 2021) was a French politician. A member of the Socialist Party, she served in the National Assembly from 1981 to 1986.

References

1943 births
2021 deaths
Socialist Party (France) politicians
20th-century French women politicians
People from Nièvre
Deputies of the 7th National Assembly of the French Fifth Republic